K. Premkumar is an Indian politician belonging to the Communist Party of India (Marxist). He is serving as the MLA of Ottappalam constituency since 24 May 2021.

References 

Kerala MLAs 2021–2026
Communist Party of India (Marxist) politicians from Kerala
Year of birth missing (living people)
Living people
Communist Party of India politicians from Kerala